Sigma Delta is a collegiate sorority at Dartmouth College in the United States. Founded in May 1977 by national sorority Sigma Kappa as its Zeta Lambda chapter, it was the first sorority to be founded on Dartmouth's campus. Women were not permitted to enroll at Dartmouth until 1972, and women-only slots were an imperative experience for the newly matriculated women. This sorority fulfilled the gap well with this new establishment where women could meet anytime in the course of the week.

By the late 1980s Dartmouth's student population had diversified.  With this diversification of the student body, the sisterhood of Dartmouth's chapter of Sigma Kappa experienced an influx of women of minorities who wished to have not only a female space, but also a space that would embrace their personal identities as women regardless of age, class, religion, or ethnicity.  In 1988, Dartmouth's Sigma Kappa chapter split from the national organization, citing that the national rituals were too heavily steeped in Christianity. With this move, Sigma Delta was established as Dartmouth's first local sorority.

References

External links
Dartmouth College
Sigma Delt

Dartmouth College Greek organizations
Sigma Kappa